This is a list of buildings that are examples of the Art Deco architectural style in Ohio, United States.

Akron 
 Akron Fulton International Airport Administration Building, Akron, 1930
 Akron YMCA Building, Akron, 1931
 Civic Theatre, Akron, 1929
 Eagles Temple, Akron, 1917
 First National Bank Tower, Akron, 1931
 Guggenheim Airship Institute, Akron, 1929
 Highland Theatre, Akron, 1938
 Huntington Tower, Akron, 1931
 Linda Theatre, Akron, 1948
 North High School, Akron, 1917
 Quaker Square, Akron, 1932

Cincinnati 
 Carew Tower, Cincinnati, 1930
 Cincinnati American Building, Cincinnati, 1928
 Cincinnati and Suburban Telephone Company Building, Cincinnati, 1931
 Cincinnati Enquirer Building, Cincinnati, 1926
 Cincinnati Municipal Lunken Airport, Cincinnati, 1925
 Cincinnati Times-Star Building, Cincinnati, 1933
 Cincinnati Union Terminal, Cincinnati 1933
 Coca-Cola Bottling Plant, Cincinnati, 1938
 Crosley Building, Cincinnati, 1929
 Dalton Street Post Office, Cincinnati, 1932
 Dixie Terminal, Cincinnati, 1921
 Esquire Theatre, Cincinnati, 1911 and 1939
 Ida Street Viaduct, Cincinnati, 1931
 John Shillito & Co., Cincinnati, 1878 and 1937
 Klosterman Baking Company, Cincinnati, 1880 and 1930s
 Main Post Office, Cincinnati, 1920s
 Olympic Garage, Cincinnati
 Paramount Building (former RKO Paramount Theater), Walnut Hills, Cincinnati, 1928
 Potter Stewart United States Courthouse, Cincinnati, 1938
 Price Hill Historical Society Museum (former Provident Bank), Price Hill, Cincinnati
 Rookwood Ice Cream Parlor, Cincinnati, 1933
 S. Gayle and Agnes P. Lowrie House, Cincinnati
 Taft Theatre, Cincinnati, 1928
 Twentieth Century Theatre, Cincinnati, 1941
 Western Hills Viaduct, Western Hills, Cincinnati

Cleveland 
 AT&T Huron Road Building, Cleveland, 1927
 Cleveland Arcade, Cleveland, 1890 and 1939
 Cleveland Stadium, Cleveland, 1931
 Embassy Theater, Cleveland, 1938
 Fenn Tower, Cleveland, 1937
 First Catholic Slovak Union, Cleveland
 Greyhound Bus Station, Cleveland, 1948
 Hope Memorial Bridge, Cleveland, 1932
 Landmark Office Towers Complex, Cleveland, 1930
 Lerner Building, Cleveland
 Ohio Bell Henderson-Endicott Exchange Building, Cleveland, 1928
 Ohio Theatre, Cleveland, 1921
 Outhwaite Homes, Cleveland, 1935
 Sears, Roebuck & Company Building, Cleveland.
 Severance Hall, Cleveland, 1931
 Shaker Square Cinemas, Cleveland
 Terminal Tower, Cleveland, 1930
 Tower City Center, Cleveland, 1927
 Whiskey Island Coast Guard Station, Whiskey Island, Cleveland, 1940

Columbus 
 American Education Press Building, 1932
 American Education Press Building, 1936
 Beggs Building, 1928
 Central Assurance Company, 1942
 Farm Crest Bakeries Building, 1949
 Jaeger Machine Company Office Building, 1936
 Law and Finance Building, 1927
 LeVeque Tower, 1927
 Lincoln Theatre, 1928
 Municipal Light Plant, 1937 and 1950s
 Ohio Judicial Center, 1931
 Old Port Columbus Airport Terminal and Control Tower, 1929
 Palace Theatre, 1927
 Royal York Apartments, 1937

Dayton 
 America's Packard Museum, Dayton, 1917
 Dayton Gym Club, Dayton, 1952
 Leslie L. Diehl Bandshell, Dayton, 1940
 Liberty Tower, Dayton, 1931
 White Tower Hamburger, Dayton, 1941
 Wympee Burger, Dayton, 1938

Mariemont 
 Cincinnati Steel Treating Company, Mariemont Historic District, Mariemont 1928
 Kellogg's Building, Mariemont Historic District, Mariemont, 1920s–1930s
 Packaging Microfactory (former Haney PRC Building), Mariemont Historic District, Mariemont, 1940

Youngstown 
 Baker's Shoes Building, Youngstown
 Burt Building (now Vindicator Building), Youngstown, 1930
 Isaly Dairy Plant (now U-Haul), Youngstown, 1930s
 Metropolitan Tower, Youngstown, 1929
 Peggy Ann Building (now Whistle & Keg), Youngstown, 1930
 Powers Auditorium, Youngstown, 1930
 S. H. Kress and Co. Building, Youngstown, 1925

Other cities 
 Ada Theatre, Ada, 1938
 Armco Research Building, Middletown, 1937
 Apollo Theatre, Oberlin, 1913
 Athena Cinema, Athens, 1915 and 1935
 Butler Township Hall, Butler Township, 1927
 Chase Tower, Mansfield
 Cheviot Field House and Community Center, Cheviot, 1936
 City Hall, East Liverpool, 1934
 Community Building, South Solon, 1938
 Donnell Building (Marathon Petroleum Headquarters), Findlay, 1929 and 1941
 Drexel Theatre, Bexley, late 1930s
 Erie County Courthouse, Sandusky, 1939
 Fairborn Theatre, Fairborn, 1948
 Fire Department and Municipal Building, Sidney, 1939
 Firestone, Toledo, 1920s
 Grafton School, Grafton, 1936
 Green Township High School, Smithville, 1936 and 1943
 The Hangar, Beachwood, 1930
 Huron High School, Huron, 1943 and 1952
 Italian American Beneficial Club Building, Sandusky, 1941
 Kerr Beverage Co., Lorain
 Kirby Flowers & Gifts, Portsmouth, 1938
 Lake 8 Movies Theatre, Barberton, 1938
 Lake Theatre, Barberton, 1938
 Mason Municipal Building, Mason
 Maumee Indoor Theatre, Maumee, 1946
 National City Bank Building, Toledo, 1930
 New Cleveland School (now a community center), Ottawa
 The Norwalk Theatre, Norwalk (1941)
 Ohio Power Company Building, Zanesville, 1929
 Police Station, Euclid
 Portsmouth City Hall, Portsmouth, 1935
 Quaker Cinema, New Philadelphia, 1940
 Richland Trust Building, Mansfield, 1929
 Silk City Diner #4655, Sabina, 1946
 Sparta Grille & Newark Coin Exchange, Newark, 1930s
 Springfield Main Post Office, Springfield, 1934
 Telephone Building, Newark, 1920s
 United States Post Office, Delphos
 Vinton County Courthouse, McArthur, 1939
 Voice of America Bethany Relay Station, Union Township, 1944
 W. T. Grant Building, Steubenville, 1920s

See also 
 List of Art Deco architecture
 List of Art Deco architecture in the United States

References 

 "Art Deco & Streamline Moderne Buildings." Roadside Architecture.com. Retrieved 2019-01-03.
 Cinema Treasures. Retrieved 2022-09-06
 "Court House Lover". Flickr. Retrieved 2022-09-06
 "New Deal Map". The Living New Deal. Retrieved 2020-12-25.
 "SAH Archipedia". Society of Architectural Historians. Retrieved 2021-11-21.

External links
 

Art Deco architecture
Art Deco

Ohio-related lists